Hope Torture is the debut single album of South Korean singer Song Ji-eun, a member of South Korean girl group Secret. The album was released on September 30, 2013 with the song "Hope Torture" serving as the lead track. The album contains three songs. It also contains the first song Jieun helped write and compose for in Date Mate.

Release
On September 24, Jieun released her mv teaser.
On September 29, Jieun released the whole mv.
On September 30, Jieun released the whole album.

Promotion
Song Jieun promoted the single Hope Torture (False Hope) in music shows in September and October 2013 on KBS's Music Bank, MBC's Show! Music Core, SBS's Inkigayo and Mnet's M! Countdown. She also held a MelOn showcase on the day of her album release where she also sang Vintage with B.A.P's Zelo.

Track listing

Charts

Album chart

Singles chart

Sales

Release history

References

External links
 Official website

2013 EPs
TS Entertainment albums